The Vinita Public School system is a mix of five schools over the Vinita, Oklahoma area in Craig County, northeast of Tulsa. These are:

Hall-Halsell Lower Elementary
Will Rogers Elementary
Ewing-Halsell Middle School
Vinita High School
Attucks Alternative Academy

Other Craig County School Systems
Bluejacket Public Schools
Ketchum Public Schools
Welch Public Schools
White Oak Public Schools

External links
Vinita Public Schools Homepage

School districts in Oklahoma
Education in Craig County, Oklahoma